Hănțești is a commune located in Suceava County, Romania. It is composed of three villages: Arțari, Berești and Hănțești.

References

Communes in Suceava County
Localities in Western Moldavia